Stephen Charles "Steve" Doyle (born 2 June 1958, in Neath) is a Welsh former professional football midfielder who made 626 appearances in the Football League playing for Preston North End, Huddersfield Town, Sunderland, Hull City and Rochdale. He also gained a cap for the Wales U-21's in 1978.

References

1958 births
Living people
Footballers from Neath
Welsh footballers
Wales under-21 international footballers
Association football midfielders
Preston North End F.C. players
Huddersfield Town A.F.C. players
Sunderland A.F.C. players
Hull City A.F.C. players
Rochdale A.F.C. players
English Football League players